Kentucky Route 35 (KY 35) is a 12.833-mile-long state highway in Kentucky that runs from US 127 in Owen County south of Sparta and heads north and goes through Sparta and meets KY 467 before meeting Interstate 71. KY 35 then passes by the Kentucky Speedway and comes to an end at US 42 in Warsaw.

Route description
KY 35 begins at an intersection with US 127 in Owen County, heading northwest as a two-lane undivided road. The route passes through farmland with some trees and homes and intersects the southern terminus of KY 1316. The road heads through woods before curving west and passing farm fields. It descends a long hill into the broad Eagle Creek valley and crosses the creek at Sparta in Gallatin County, in which it is Sparta Pike. In Sparta, the road crosses a CSX railroad line and intersects KY 467. The route forms a brief concurrency with KY 467 for a block and passes homes and businesses. Upon splitting, KY 35 curves north and leaves Sparta, becoming a three-lane road with two northbound lanes and one southbound lane. The road continues through woodland before it runs between woods to the west and farm fields to the east. The route passes through more agricultural areas and crosses KY 465 before it gains a center left-turn lane and comes to an interchange with I-71.

Past this interchange, KY 35 continues north as a three-lane road with a center left-turn lane and passes to the east of Kentucky Speedway. The road loses the turning lane and curves northeast into a mix of fields and woods with some homes, turning back to the north. The route winds north through more forested areas with occasional clearings and residences. KY 35 intersects the northern terminus of KY 1130 before heading to the northeast and coming to a junction with the northern terminus of KY 455. The road heads intro agricultural areas with some homes, where it curves to the north-northwest and enters Warsaw. KY 35 passes through residential areas before it heads onto Main Cross Street and comes to its northern terminus at US 42 in the downtown area.

History
KY 35 originally ran to the Tennessee border using what is now US 127 before the US 127 was extended to its current longevity after it was extended into Kentucky and Tennessee in the late 1950s.

Major intersections

References

0035
0035
Transportation in Gallatin County, Kentucky
U.S. Route 127